Cabhair is an organisation which supports Continuity IRA prisoners.

The organisation was founded in early 1987 following the split in the republican movement in 1986 when Republican Sinn Féin and the Continuity IRA broke away from the Provisional IRA and Sinn Féin. It claims to be "solely dependent" on those who donate to it.

In March 2017 Cabhair and Republican Sinn Féin who have been described as the political wing of the Continuity IRA and the IRPWA became involved within a dispute. They accused the IRPWA of poaching for members after they "bullied" a prisoner supported by Cabhair and he refused to be a part of the IRPWA.

References

1987 establishments in Ireland
Irish republican organisations
Organizations established in 1987
Prisoner support